Otto von Camphausen (21 October 1812 – 18 May 1896) was a Prussian statesman.

Biography
Camphausen was born at Hünshoven, part of Geilenkirchen on the right bank of the River Wurm, in the Rhine Province. Having studied jurisprudence and political economy at the universities of Bonn, Heidelberg, Munich and Berlin, he entered the legal career at Cologne, and immediately devoted his attention to financial and commercial questions.

Nominated assessor in 1837, he acted for five years in this capacity at Magdeburg and Coblenz, became in 1845 counsellor in the ministry of finance, and was in 1849 elected a member of the second chamber of the Prussian diet, joining the Moderate Liberal party.

In 1869 he was appointed minister of finance. On taking office, he was confronted with a deficit in the revenue, which he successfully cleared off by effecting a conversion of a greater part of the state loans. The Franco-Prussian War indemnity enabled him to redeem a considerable portion of the state debt and to remit certain taxes. He was, however, a too warm adherent of free trade principles to enjoy the confidence either of the Agrarian Party or of Prince Otto von Bismarck, and his antagonism to the tobacco monopoly and the general economic policy of the latter brought about his retirement.

Camphausen's great services to Prussia were recognized by his sovereign in the bestowal of the Order of the Black Eagle in 1895, a dignity carrying with it a patent of nobility. He died at Berlin.

References

External links

1812 births
1896 deaths
German untitled nobility
Members of the Prussian House of Lords
People from the Rhine Province
Prussian politicians
University of Bonn alumni
Heidelberg University alumni
Ludwig Maximilian University of Munich alumni
Humboldt University of Berlin alumni
Finance ministers of Prussia